Live in Hamburg is a live album by German techno group Scooter. The album was released on 7 May 2010, and is accompanied by Blu-ray and DVD releases.

History
The album was recorded at the "biggest Scooter concert ever" at the Color Line Arena, in Hamburg, Germany. This was during the Under The Radar Over The Top Tour, where Scooter were promoting their 2009 studio album Under the Radar Over the Top.

Track listing

CD Release

Web Release

DVD and Blu-ray

A DVD was released along with a special edition Blu-ray, each containing the accompanying live footage to each track on the online release. The Blu-ray contains every Scooter music video to date as well.

Release history

Reception and chart performance
When the CD/DVD/Blu-ray was announced, many pre-ordered it from Amazon.de. The pre-orders were very high, and the CD was expected to chart well since it stayed at number one in the Live Albums category on Amazon.

Upon release, the CD entered the official German album chart at fourteen, whilst the DVD entered the German DVD Media Control Charts at number one.

Reception for the CD and DVD was generally good, though many criticized the lack of one of the more popular tracks that was played during the tour, "Where the Beats...", which was specifically re-edited for the tour. No official statement was made as to why this track was omitted, nor why it was the only one excluded, but many fans suspected that it was because the modified version utilized a chorus very similar to the U2 song "Where the Streets Have No Name". Where the Beats... would eventually be included on Clubland TV in the UK in 2017.

Charts

References

External links
Scooter Official Site

Scooter (band) albums
Albums recorded at Color Line Arena
2010 live albums
2010 video albums